Crookhaven Heads Light  is an active lighthouse located at Crookhaven Heads, a headland on the south side of the entrance to the Shoalhaven River, north of Culburra Beach, New South Wales, Australia. Together with a movable light flashing yellow every 2s it serves as a range light into the channel. The lighthouse is in a severely deteriorated condition, and considered by some the most endangered lighthouse in New South Wales, suffering from repeated vandalization.

History
The first light on the vicinity was a red lantern made from a ship's masthead supported on two poles, present at the river entrance since 1872.

The apparatus had been a brass lantern.

The current lighthouse was commissioned in 1904 and the old wooden lighthouse was immediately demolished. The lantern used was the one from the former Cape St George Lighthouse which was replaced by Point Perpendicular Light in 1899. The name of the station was then changed to Crookhaven Heads.

The power source was changed to solar power in the late 20th century.

State today
The lighthouse is currently in a severely deteriorated condition due to vandalism. The doors have been broken and removed, the windows and lantern room glass have been smashed and trash has been dumped inside.  Vandalism is encouraged by its isolation and aggravated by the fact that the reserve is overgrown, making it impossible to see from the nearby Culburra Beach village.

The lighthouse was restored in the 1990s with wire mesh surrounding the lantern room, but no ongoing plan or presence was set.  It was quickly vandalized again, and every piece of glass in the lantern was broken despite the protective mesh.

One step subsequently undertaken was to strip away the thicket so it would be more visible, but without a permanent solution that protects the site, the authorities were reluctant to provide further funds.  In 2008 NSW Maritime reported spending $25,600 AUD installing a separate light high atop the tower to protect it from vandalism.

In July 2010, funds of $100,000 AUD were allocated for restoration of the lighthouse by the NSW Minister for Lands Tony Kelly. The next step was to be a scoping study to determine the extent of work required, which was to begin in the middle of July, with restoration work to start by the end of August.

Discussions were held between the Shoalhaven City Council and the state MP for South Coast, Shelley Hancock on 2013-09-23.
In April 2015 the lantern is completely missing.

Structure
The tower is made from bricks and attached to a one-story service building. Both are painted white, though the colour is deteriorating.

Site operation
The light is managed by NSW Maritime while the land is owned and managed by the Land and Property Management Authority.

Visiting
The lighthouse is accessible by a short hike through the bush from the parking area at the north end of Prince Edward Avenue in Culburra Beach. There are two tracks up to the lighthouse, one via a short boardwalk and the other to the left (west) via the beach. The grounds are open, but the tower is closed.

See also

 List of lighthouses in Australia

Notes

References

 Listed as "Crookhaven River, entrance".
 Listed as "Crookhaven Head".

Lighthouses completed in 1904
Lighthouses in New South Wales
City of Shoalhaven
1882 establishments in Australia